John Haggerty (born 1960) is a guitarist. 

John Haggerty or Hagerty may also refer to:

John A. Haggerty (1841–1910), Wisconsin state legislator and businessman
John K. Hagerty (1867–1945), Pennsylvania state representative
John Haggerty, New York political candidate who lost the 1920 United States House of Representatives elections
John Haggerty, political candidate who lost the 2014 California Attorney General primary election
John Haggerty (Canadian football), Canadian football punter
Jack Hagerty (John Leo Hagerty, 1903–1982), American football player, coach and college athletics administrator

See also
John Hawkins Hagarty (1816–1900), Canadian lawyer, teacher and judge
John Hegarty (disambiguation)